Alexander "Al" Gafa (born April 9, 1941, New York City) is an American jazz guitarist.

Career
Gafa worked extensively as a session musician for recordings in the mid and late 1960s in New York. In jazz he worked in that decade with Kai Winding, Michel Legrand, Sam Donahue, Duke Pearson, and Carmen McRae. He worked with McRae until 1971, then played in the 1970s with Dizzy Gillespie, Mike Longo, and Yusef Lateef. Gafa put together his own small groups in the decade; his sidemen included Kenny Barron, Ben Brown, Al Foster, Steve LaSpina, Andy LaVerne, Dave Shapiro, and Richard Wyands. He worked with Johnny Hartman from 1978 to 1982 and in the early 1980s with Susannah McCorkle and Joe Albany, Sammy Davis Jr., Sylvia Syms, Morgana King, Shirley Horn.

Discography

As leader
 Leblon Beach (Pablo, 1976)

As sideman
With Dizzy Gillespie
 Dizzy Gillespie, Sonny Stitt Quintet Live in Paris & Copenhagen 1974
 Dizzy Gillespie in Brazil with Trio Mocoto (1974)
 Bahiana (Pablo, 1976)

With Johnny Hartman
 I've Been There (Perception, 1973)
 Once in Every Life (Bee Hive, 1981)

With Mike Longo
 The Awakening (Mainstream, 1972)
 Matrix (Mainstream, 1972)

With Susannah McCorkle
 The People That You Never Get to Love (Inner City, 1981)
 Let's Face to Music (Concord Jazz, 1997)
 From Broken Hearts to Blue Skies (Concord Jazz, 1999)

With Duke Pearson
 The Phantom (Blue Note, 1968)
 How Insensitive  (Blue Note, 1969)
 I Don't Care Who Knows It (Blue Note, 1996)

With others
 Joe Albany, Portrait of an Artist  (Elektra Musician, 1982)
 Astrud Gilberto, Now (Perception, 1972)
 Shirley Horn, Where Are You Going (Perception, 1973)
 Carmen McRae, Just a Little Lovin (Atlantic, 1970)
 The Monkees, More of the Monkees (Rhino, 1994)
 Joe Newman, Sing to the Lord a New Song
 Paul Simon, There Goes Rhymin' Simon (Columbia, 1973)
 Larry Willis, A New Kind of Soul (1970)
 Kai Winding, Dirty Dog

References

American jazz guitarists
Musicians from New York City
1941 births
Living people
20th-century American guitarists
Jazz musicians from New York (state)